Taj ol Din Kola (also Romanized as Tāj ol Dīn Kolā, Tāj ed Dīn Kolā, and Tāj od Dīn Kolā) is a village in Baladeh Kojur Rural District, in the Central District of Nowshahr County, Mazandaran Province, Iran. At the 2006 census, its population was 281, in 71 families.

References 

Populated places in Nowshahr County